Yury Deksbakh (born 10 April 1928) is a Soviet fencer. He competed in the individual and team épée events at the 1952 Summer Olympics.

References

External links

1928 births
Possibly living people
Soviet male fencers
Olympic fencers of the Soviet Union
Fencers at the 1952 Summer Olympics
Martial artists from Moscow